Wysoka Strzyżowska  (Vysoka) is the largest village in the administrative district of Gmina Strzyżów, within Strzyżów County, Subcarpathian Voivodeship, in south-eastern Poland.

The village was first mentioned in 1277, in a document published by Bolesław Wstydliwy. He writes about the existence of the village of Wysoka in this area, which consisted of four villages of the time: Grodeczna, Golczowska Wola (today's Golcówka), Zielonczyna Wola (later called Kołomyja, then Połomia and finally Michałówka) and Stodolina Wola (today's Stodolina). The four remained separate villages until the mid-19th century, when they were merged and renamed Wysoka Strzyżowska.

References

Villages in Strzyżów County